Costanza Fiorentini (born 25 November 1984) is an Italian synchronized swimmer who competed in the 2004 Summer Olympics.

References

1984 births
Living people
Italian synchronized swimmers
Olympic synchronized swimmers of Italy
Synchronized swimmers at the 2004 Summer Olympics